The following is a timeline of the history of the city of Yazd, Iran.

Prior to 20th century

 749 - Abu-Moslem Khorasani in power.
 1051 - Kakuyid Faramurz in power.
 1070 - Ali ibn Faramurz in power (approximate date).
 1119 - Masjed-e ʿAtiq (Friday Mosque) built by ʿAlāʿ-al-Dawla Garšāsp.
 1141 - Atabegs of Yazd in power.
 1228/1229 - Mahmud Shah in power.
 1271/1272 - Ala al-Dawla in power.
 1274/1275 - Flood.
 14th century CE - Muin al-Din Yazdi writes history of Yazd.
 1307/1308 - Duvazdah Imam (tomb) built.
 1318 - Muzaffarid Mubariz al-Din Muhammad becomes governor.
 1320 - Shah Kamal madrasa built.
 1324 - Jame Mosque of Yazd built.
 1325
 Madrasa-ye Rokniya built.
 Italian traveller Odoric of Pordenone visits city.
 1346/1347 - City walls expanded.
 1365 - Tomb of Šams-al-Din Moḥammad built (approximate date).
 1368/1369 - Masjed-e Rig (mosque) built.
 1385/1386 - Mosque of Ḵᵛāja Ḥāji Abu’l-Maʿāli built.
 1395 - Fortifications built.
 15th century CE - Historians Ahmad ibn Husain Ali Katib and Jafar ibn Muhammad ibn Hasan Jafari each write histories of Yazd.
 1405/1406 - Iskandar b. Umar Shaykh becomes governor.
 1421/1422 - Bazaar built near Mehriz gate.
 1456 - Flood.
 1457 - Haji-Qanbar Bazaar built.
 1720s - Ghalzai Afghans in power.
 1742/1743 - Mirza Husayn becomes governor.
 1747 - Mohammad Taqi Khan becomes governor (until 1798).

20th century

 1903 - Anti-Baháʼí unrest.
 1920 - Population: 45,000 (approximate estimate).
 1931 - Factory in business.
 1935 - Pahlavi Street constructed.
 1940 - Yazd Ateshkade (Zoroastrian building) opens.
 1976 - City Hall built.
 1982 - Population: 193,000 (estimate).
 1986 - Population: 234,003.
 1991 - Shahid Ghandi Yazd (football club) formed.
 1996 - Population: 326,776.

21st century

 2004 - Foolad Yazd F.C. (football club) formed.
 2009 - Yazd Solar Power Station commissioned near city.
 2011 - Population: 486,152.
 2013 - 14 June: Local election held.
 2014 - Tarbiat Yazd F.C. (football club) active.

See also
 Yazd history (fa)
 List of mayors of Yazd
 Timelines of other cities in Iran: Bandar Abbas, Hamadan, Isfahan, Kerman, Mashhad, Qom, Shiraz, Tabriz, Tehran

References

This article incorporates information from the Persian Wikipedia.

Bibliography

in English
 
 
 
  via Google Books
 
  
 
 
  (History of qanat water technology in the city)

in other languages
 
 
 
  (Written in 15th century CE)
  1969-1975 (3 volumes)
  
  (Written in 15th century CE?)

External links

 
  (Bibliography)
 Items related to Yazd, various dates (via Qatar Digital Library)
 
 Items related to Yazd, various dates (via Europeana)
 Items related to Yazd, various dates (via Digital Public Library of America)
 
 

Years in Iran
Yazd
yazd